The Australian light destroyer project aimed to build a class of small destroyers for the Royal Australian Navy (RAN). The project began in 1966 with the goal of developing simple light destroyers (DDL) to support patrol boat operations. The project was rescoped in 1969 when the Navy decided to use the ships to replace other destroyers as they retired, leading to an increase in the design's size and complexity. Concerns over the ships' cost and technological risk led the government to cancel the DDL project in 1973 on the RAN's advice, and a variant of the United States'  was procured instead.

Requirement
From 1963 to 1966, RAN warships took part in the Indonesian Confrontation. During this period, Australian minesweepers and frigates patrolled Malaysia's coastline to counter Indonesian infiltration parties travelling in small craft. These ships also bombarded Indonesian positions in East Kalimantan near the border with Malaysia on several occasions. The RAN's experiences during this conflict led it to perceive a need for light destroyers and patrol boats tailored to Confrontation-type tasks.

When the DDL project began in 1966, the ships' role was to support patrol boats during anti-infiltration operations and complement the Navy's existing destroyer force. The intention was that the DDLs would be fast, simply armed and smaller than conventional destroyers. It was also hoped that a common DDL hull design could be used to produce variants optimised for different roles. The RAN and British Royal Navy (RN) held discussions in 1967 on jointly developing DDLs, but the RN withdrew from the project when the Australians insisted on arming the ships with United States-designed weapons.

The DDL design evolved during the late 1960s. As a result of planning conducted during 1967 and 1968, it gradually became clear that the ships would replace rather than complement the Navy's three s and four early s. Accordingly, it was specified in 1969 that the DDLs would be more capable and flexible than originally conceived, allowing the RAN to maintain its capabilities as the older destroyers retired. The intended roles for the DDLs' were set in 1970 by an agreement between the RAN and Department of Defence, which specified that the ships were to be capable of destroying equivalent surface warships, carrying out maritime interdiction duties, commanding groups of patrol boats and aircraft, have reasonable anti-aircraft and anti-submarine capabilities and be able to provide naval gunfire support to land forces.

The RAN originally intended to order up to ten DDLs. All the ships were to be built in Australia to maintain local shipbuilding capabilities, and Australian industry was to be involved to the greatest possible extent. Production of the ships was to be evenly split between Cockatoo Island Dockyard in Sydney and Williamstown Naval Dockyard in Melbourne.

Design
The DDL design changed considerably over the life of the project. The initial specification was for a 1,000-ton escort vessel and in an early design the class was to have a single  gun as its primary armament and carry a helicopter. These DDLs were to be armed with two five-inch guns and operate a single light helicopter.

After preparing its initial sketch design, the Navy contracted Yarrow Admiralty Research Division (Y-ARD) in July 1970 to complete preliminary designs for the DDLs. As an initial stage, Y-ARD was required to develop sketch designs for six different armament configurations using a common hull. Requests for tender for studies on major sub-components were also issued in 1970, and these were completed by mid-1971.

The RAN conducted armament effectiveness studies of each of the six DDL variants in parallel with Y-ARD's development of the designs. These studies found that including an area air defence capability and an ability to operate two helicopters greatly improved the DDL's effectiveness. As a result, these features were included in the Navy's specification for the DDL design which was issued in late 1970. By this time the design had evolved to specify a general-purpose destroyer of 4,200 tons, armed with a five-inch gun and a Tartar missile launcher, and capable of operating two helicopters. The changes increased the cost of building the ships, and the number planned was reduced to three. Nevertheless, the DDL design was considered likely to result in very capable ships, with the 1972–73 edition of Jane's Fighting Ships commenting favourably.

The changes to the DDL design reflected shifting requirements and poor project management by the Navy. The development of an Australian-designed ship customised for Australian conditions caused naval officers to include requirements beyond those which were essential. These changes were made without regard for costs, as the team tasked with developing the specifications was not also responsible for the ships' final price and delivery schedule. The Navy's failure to maintain control of the design requirements and make cost-performance trade-offs may have been due to its limited experience in overseeing the design of new warships.

Cancellation
Despite the changes to the design and its growing costs, construction of three DDLs was approved by the Liberal Party McMahon Government in August 1972. At this time, the total project cost was estimated at A$355 million; this figure included all costs associated with building three ships and operating them for ten years. The ships themselves were expected to cost approximately $210 million. All three ships were to be built at Williamstown Dockyard, with construction of the first ship beginning in 1975, followed by the other ships at two-yearly intervals. The initial DDL was to be commissioned in 1980, and the third in 1984. Further DDLs may also have been ordered over time to replace the Navy's destroyers as they reached the end of their service lives.

The DDL design was not supported by the Australian Labor Party (ALP) opposition, which believed that the ships would be too large and expensive for escort, patrol and surveillance duties. In June 1972 The Australian Quarterly published an article by the shadow minister for Defence, Lance Barnard, in which he argued that "the DDL concept goes completely against trends in the development of vessels for maritime warfare", and that the high cost of the warships would mean that not enough would be purchased to meet the RAN's requirements. Barnard suggested that if the DDL project was cancelled the RAN's needs could be met at a lower cost by selecting from one of several existing foreign designs for smaller, but just as well armed, destroyers and building these ships under licence in Australia. The Minister for the Navy, Malcolm Mackay, rejected Barnard's criticisms in August 1972 and stated that studies carried out by the Navy and Department of Defence had found that smaller and less heavily armed ships would not be able to fill the roles intended for the DDLs. Barnard became Minister for Defence following the election of the ALP Whitlam Government in December 1972, and directed in January 1973 that the DDL project be reviewed. This review considered the feasibility of the project, including its budget and timeline, as well as the suitability of comparable American, British and Dutch warships.

Increasing costs and concerns over the ships' design led to the cancellation of the DDL project. The Department of Defence observed that the DDL's costs were escalating and it was unable to finalise the design. The Navy also reviewed the project and found that it was unduly expensive, and a Joint Parliamentary committee concluded that a unique Australian design entailed significant technological risks. As a result, the Navy recommended to the Government that the DDL project be cancelled, and this took place in August 1973. The cost of the project to the Navy had been A$1.7 million, most of which was spent on design investigations and management consultancies. The opposition Liberal Party opposed the decision to cancel the DDL project.

Aftermath

The DDL project's problems harmed the Australian shipbuilding industry. The cancellation of both the DDLs and another project to develop an Australian fast combat support ship design led to a perception that technical risks needed to be minimised when selecting new warships, and it was preferable to rely on proven foreign designs. Australian industry was also left with a bad impression as companies involved in the project had devoted considerable resources to preparing tenders for the DDL. Y-ARD greatly reduced its presence in Australia, and the Australian naval design experts it had been employed were offered jobs in the United Kingdom.

Despite cancelling the DDL project, the government endorsed the RAN's requirement for new destroyer-type warships and requested a review of existing foreign designs to find a replacement. The process of evaluating new designs was managed by what had been the DDL project office, and in line with the government's priorities it initially focused on selecting affordable warships of a proven design for further consideration. A large number of designs were studied by the project office, and the United States' s and a variant of the British Type 42 destroyer armed with SM-1 surface to air missiles were eventually short listed for detailed evaluation. The project team found that the Type 42 was the only design capable of meeting the Navy's requirement, and stated that the Oliver Hazard Perry class was "a second rate escort that falls short of the DDL requirements on virtually every respect". Despite this, there were serious concerns over whether it would be possible to fit SM-1 missiles to the Type 42. This led the government to approve the purchase of two Oliver Hazard Perry class ships from the United States in April 1974.

The DDL project was reviewed again when the Liberal Fraser Government came into office in late 1975. The review panel unanimously advised the new Minister for Defence James Killen that the DDL project was no longer viable as the total cost of the ships would be about $130 million higher than the Oliver Hazard Perry project, and it would take three years longer for the DDLs to be completed. Killen accepted this advice, and a firm order for two Oliver Hazard Perry frigates was placed in February 1976. A third ship was ordered in late 1977. The expertise of the DDL project office and the preparations which had been undertaken to manage the process of ordering and building the ships contributed to the Navy's ability to rapidly evaluate alternative designs and oversee their entry into service once an order was placed.

References

Citations

Bibliography

Further reading

Destroyer classes
Light Destroyer
Abandoned military projects of Australia